Sir Jonathan Michael Thompson,  is a British civil servant who served as the Permanent Secretary of the Ministry of Defence (MOD) from September 2012 until April 2016, when he succeeded Dame Lin Homer as Permanent Secretary and Chief Executive of HM Revenue and Customs. He became Chief Executive of the Financial Reporting Council after leaving HMRC in Autumn 2019.

Background 
Thompson was born in Norwich, and educated at Earlham High School, Norwich City College and Anglia Polytechnic, which later became Anglia Ruskin University. He became CIPFA qualified in 1989.

Career 
Thompson was in local government as Finance Director for North Somerset Council.

Thompson joined the Civil Service in 2004, as OFSTED’s first finance director. He moved to Department for Education and Skills as their Director-General for Corporate Services in 2006, leaving the then Department for Children, Schools and Families to join the Ministry of Defence (MOD) as Director General of Finance in 2009. Thompson became Permanent Secretary of the MOD in 2012 succeeding Ursula Brennan who moved to the Ministry of Justice. In 2015, he was paid a salary of between £165,000 and £169,999 by the MOD, making him one of the 328 most highly paid people in the British public sector at that time. He then became Chief Executive and First Permanent Secretary of HM Revenue and Customs. Thompson is currently the Chief Executive of the Financial Reporting Council. Thompson is also a non-executive director on the board of HS2 Ltd.

Thompson was appointed a Knight Commander of the Order of the Bath (KCB) in the 2019 New Year Honours, "for public service."

Personal life 
Thompson married his wife Dawn in 1987 and has three sons and one grandson and one granddaughter.  He is a supporter of Norwich City Football Club, and lives in Cambridgeshire.

Offices held

References 

Local government officers in England
1964 births
Living people
Alumni of Anglia Ruskin University
Permanent Under-Secretaries of State for Defence
People from Norwich
Knights Commander of the Order of the Bath
People educated at City College Norwich
Chief Executives of HM Revenue and Customs